Forty Creek is a brand of Canadian whisky produced by the Italian beverage company Campari Group. The distillery is located in Grimsby, Ontario, Canada (between Hamilton and Niagara Falls). The brand and its distillery were privately launched in 1992 by John Hall, a first-generation whisky maker and the owner of Kittling Ridge Wines & Spirits, and were purchased (including the ageing inventory) by Campari Group in March 2014 for  million (US$ million). Forty Creek Barrel Select is the main whisky produced under the Forty Creek brand name. 

Hall launched the brand with two expressions called Forty Creek Barrel Select and Forty Creek Three Grain. In 2007, the first of a series of Forty Creek Special Reserves bottlings were released, which are limited-edition expressions that vary with each lot. In 2012, Forty Creek Copper Pot and Forty Creek Cream were introduced.

Varieties

Barrel Select
Forty Creek Barrel Select is a blended Canadian whisky, 40% alcohol (ethanol) by volume, 80 proof. It is made with rye, barley and corn (maize). Each grain is fermented, distilled, and aged separately to produce a "meritage" of single grain whiskies. After distillation using a small-batch, copper pot still, the whiskies are aged separately 6–10 years in small cask 40-gallon white oak barrels of varying toasting levels. Vintage sherry casks round off some of the aged whiskies after they are blended, for an additional six months.

Special Reserves
The production of limited edition Forty Creek whiskies began in 2007. Typically, the bottles are individually numbered, the public has a period of time in which they can reserve a particular bottle number, and the whisky is released in September – followed by a special weekend of events at the distillery.

Awards and accolades

Malt Advocate magazine named John Hall "Pioneer of the Year" in 2007 because of his contribution to new lines of thought and new methods in the world of whisky.

Forty Creek has garnered a number of awards at Spirit ratings competitions and from rating organizations.  The awards include:
 Tier 1 Status – Proof66 Liquor Ratings Aggregator.
 Double Gold Medal – San Francisco World Spirits Competition 2006.
 Gold Medal – World Selection (Monde Selection), Brussels, Belgium
 Gold Medal – 2010 International Review of Spirits, Chicago
 Gold Medal – 2011 International Review of Spirits, Chicago
 Gold Medal – 2012 International Review of Spirits, Chicago – Rating: 90 points (Exceptional)
 5 Gold Medals – San Francisco World Spirits Competition 2013

In the 2008 Icons of Whisky Canada competition held by London England's Whisky Magazine, John K. Hall was awarded Ambassador of the Year and Kittling Ridge was deemed Best Distiller.

References

External links
 
 Malt Advocate Whisky Awards "Canadian Whisky of the Year": Forty Creek Confederation Oak, February 19, 2011
 John Hall, guest blog on Whisky Advocate Web Site, October 2009
 Forty Creek Barrel Select Review from The Art of Drink
 Whisky Magazine article: Up on Forty Creek, the whisky sends me, by Charles K. Cowdery, issue 47
 Forty Creek Barrel Select - Tasting Notes and Scores from Whisky Magazine (Michael Jackson & Dave Broom) 

Canadian whisky
Canadian alcoholic drinks
Campari Group